Michael James Holtz (born October 10, 1972) is an American former professional baseball middle relief pitcher who played from  through  for the California / Anaheim Angels (1996–2001), Oakland Athletics (2002), San Diego Padres (2002), and Boston Red Sox (2006). He bats and throws left-handed.

In an eight-season career, Holtz posted a 16–19 record with a 4.76 ERA and three saves in 353 relief appearances.
 
Following the bulk of his Major League Baseball (MLB) career, Holtz played for the Yokohama BayStars of the Japanese Central League in 2005 and had a 0–1 mark with 4.38 ERA and 22 strikeouts in  innings of work. He came back to the majors to pitch in three games for the Red Sox in 2006.

External links

Boston Globe
Japanese cards

1972 births
Living people
American expatriate baseball players in Canada
American expatriate baseball players in Japan
Anaheim Angels players
Baseball players from Virginia
Boise Hawks players
Boston Red Sox players
California Angels players
Edmonton Trappers players
Lake Elsinore Storm players
Major League Baseball pitchers
Midland Angels players
Nashville Sounds players
Nippon Professional Baseball pitchers
Oakland Athletics players
Pawtucket Red Sox players
Portland Beavers players
Rancho Cucamonga Quakes players
San Diego Padres players
Sportspeople from Arlington County, Virginia
Vancouver Canadians players
Yokohama BayStars players